Juventus Football Club have had overall 24 presidents and two administrative committees, some of which have been members of the club's main stakeholder group and elected since the club's foundation by the then assemblea di soci (membership assembly) through an annual meeting. Since 1949, they have been often corporate managers that were nominated in charge by the assemblea degli azionisti (stakeholders assembly).

List
Here is a complete list of them from when Eugenio Canfari took over at the club in 1898, until the present day.

Legend:
(cpg.) Chairmanship Committee of War.
(int.) Chairmen on interim charge.

References 

chairmen
 List